Children of the Sun is a 1957 book by Morris West. It was his first international success.

The book was a best seller in Europe and England and marked a turning point in the career of West. The Sydney Morning Herald said "with this work, West not only found his way as a writer but discovered the theme that would underpin almost all of his subsequent books — the nature and misuse of power. Of the 18 novels he was to write post-1957, 15 are on this subject."

Background
West researched the book over six months in Naples.

TV Adaptation
In 1959 it was announced the show would be adapted for the Australian anthology series Shell Presents.

It was adapted for ITV anthology television series ITV Television Playhouse in 1961.

References

1956 novels
Works by Morris West